Julie Tolentino is a visual and performance artist, dancer, and choreographer.  Her work is influenced from an array of visual, archival, and movement strategies.

Life
Tolentino was born in San Francisco to a Filipino/Salvadoran family. She began formal dance training in ballet, modern, jazz and Contemporary dance, as well as Afro-Haitian and Flamenco. In 1980s, Tolentino moved to New York where she lived for twenty-five years, she then moved to the Mohave Desert and created an off-grid house/studio.

Work
Tolentino was a member of the activist group ACT UP and appeared in the 1989 "Kissing Doesn’t Kill: Greed and Indifference Do" campaign with Lola Flash by the AIDS awareness artist-activist collective Gran Fury. Tolentino posed with Madonna in a series of homo-erotic photos in the book, SEX, and was a featured artist for an artist book by Rodarte photographed by Catherine Opie. From 1990–1999, Tolentino regularly danced in David Roussève's Dance Theatre Company, 'Reality.

Tolentino founded the Clit Club, a queer and pro-sex lesbian nightclub which was operational from 1990–2012, which was referenced by Primus on their song “De Anza Jig.” She is an AIDS activist, caregiver, events coordinator, and prominent supporter of lesbian visibility. In her own words, "My work has an inherent base in the experience of being a survivor, activist, and friend/helper/caregiver ... as I focus on the accumulation of 'small' moments and the simplicity, tenderness, reverence of these experiences as well as how they grow into sometimes overwhelming and chaotic times." Tolentino co-wrote  the Lesbian AIDS Project's Women's Safer Sex Handbook, and was a founding member of ACT UP New York's House of Color Video Collective. Currently, she is the Provocations co-editor for The Drama Review (TDR)  with MIT Press.

Since 1998, Tolentino has presented solo and group installations and performance work at the New Museum, PARTICIPANT INC, The Kitchen, and Performa, New York; the Haus der Kulturen der Welt, Berlin; La Batofar, Paris, France; Momenta and Monkey Town Gallery; Madre Museo, Naples, Italy; Walker Arts Center; the Los Angeles Contemporary Exhibitions;

In 2013, Tolentino staged the solo exhibition Raised by Wolves at Commonwealth and Council in Los Angeles, which included over 50 intimate, interactive performances alongside a series of site-specific sculptures. In 2019, the artist mounted her second exhibition at the Koreatown gallery, REPEATER, an "immersive installation incorporating sculpture, video, and 108 hours of performance."

In 2019 Tolentino created the performance REPEATER, a performance that totaled to 108 hours over the course of 6 weeks at Commonwealth and Council. The artist performed in the space every Thursday, Friday, and Saturday from noon to six. The room was darkened with white carpet. Objects occasionally used in performance were spread throughout the room including a sawhorse covered in black latex gloves, mirrors on casters, wire sculptures, etched mirror cubes, and large neoprene bags.

Tolentino was included in the 2022 Whitney Biennial. For the exhibition they collaborated with Ivy Kwan Arce to create a work with glass orbs, satellites, and performance.

References

External links

Curvemag.com
Nytimes.com
 Timetchells.com
Hemi.nyu.edu
Villagevoice.com
Latimes.com
Artforum.com
Archive.org

Living people
American choreographers
American performance artists
American female dancers
Dancers from California
Year of birth missing (living people)
21st-century American women artists
21st-century American artists
American artists of Filipino descent
American people of Salvadoran descent
Artists from San Francisco
American women performance artists